Bramston Beach is a coastal town and locality in Cairns Region, Queensland, Australia.

Geography 

The Bramston Beach locality comprises two coastal plain areas each surrounded by small mountain ranges. The locality is bounded along the north-east by the Coral Sea and by the small mountain ranges.

The northern coastal plain is partly within the Russell River National Park with the remainder used for agriculture, principally grazing. Bramston Beach Road passes through the southern part of the northern coastal plain through to the sandy beach there. The small residential and camping area is located at the end of the road by the beach.

The southern coastal plain area also features a sandy beach but there are no formed roads through the area, only tracks. It is entirely freehold land used for agriculture, again principally grazing.

The beach at Bramston Beach is a turtle nesting area but is suffering from natural and manmade threats to the nesting area. There are also crocodiles in the area.

It is a popular spot with caravaners and is a good fishing location and has a slightly older than average population.

History 

The town is named after Sir John Bramston, an early politician in Queensland.

In March 1872, after the wreck of The Maria on Bramble reef, one of the groups of survivors landed their raft just to the south of Cooper Point. The Djiru people in the area were exceedingly hospitable in feeding and sheltering this group until Captain John Moresby arrived in the Basilisk to return them to the British settlements further south. This group of survivors spent much of their time at a Djiru village that was located at modern day Bramston Beach. Some Djiru villages in the area consisted of quite large huts with multiple entrances. W.T. Forster, a member of this group of castaways recorded his experiences with the Djiru in a pamphlet published later on in 1872. Forster and some officials returned later to thank the Djiru and give gifts of blankets, but the village was devoid of people due to the Native Police having visited the locality the previous day.

The 1998 film, The Thin Red Line, was partially filmed on Bramston Beach.

References

External links

 Town map of Bramston Beach, 1976
 Bramston Beach Travel.
Bramston Beach.

Populated places in Far North Queensland
Coastal towns in Queensland
Beaches of Queensland
Suburbs of Cairns
Localities in Queensland